

The Piel CP-150 Onyx is a single-seat, low-cost and low-power ultralight aircraft. The aircraft was designed by French aeronautical engineer Claude Piel. The aircraft is an all-wood single seat microlight based on Mignet principles with fixed tricycle undercarriage and one 12 hp Solo engine.

Specifications

Notes

References

 
 
 
 
 

1980s French ultralight aircraft
Piel aircraft